This is a list of U.S. Open Cup winning soccer head coaches.

History 

The Lamar Hunt U.S. Open Cup is a knock-out, single-elimination tournament open to all men's soccer clubs that are affiliated with the United States Soccer Federation. Teams from across the American soccer pyramid, from the top division of Major League Soccer to the bottom tiers of the United States Adult Soccer Association are eligible to participate. Clubs that are in higher tiers of the soccer pyramid earn byes to deeper rounds of the tournament.

Inaugurated in 1913, it is the oldest active competition in American soccer. The tournament was founded as the National Challenge Cup, and gained quick prominence as the premier competition in the United States. Its importance was due to the formation of regional leagues without a true top-division soccer league that was open to all sectors of the nation.

Winning head coaches

See also 
 U.S. Open Cup

References 

Winning head coaches, list of